The Kwifa are an ethnic and linguistic group based in  Tanzania .

Ethnic groups in Tanzania
Indigenous peoples of East Africa